Nathan Garnsey House is a historic home located near Rexford, Saratoga County, New York. It was built in 1789, and is a two-story, five bay, double pile, Federal style brick dwelling painted white.  The house sits on a limestone foundation and has a side gable roof and central chimney.  The house has two small rear additions. Also on the property is a contributing barn (c. 1850).

It was listed on the National Register of Historic Places in 2012.

References

Houses on the National Register of Historic Places in New York (state)
Federal architecture in New York (state)
Houses completed in 1789
Houses in Saratoga County, New York
National Register of Historic Places in Saratoga County, New York